The TK90X was a Brazilian ZX Spectrum clone made in 1985 by Microdigital Electrônica, a company from São Paulo, that had previously manufactured ZX80 (TK80, TK82) and ZX81 clones (TK82C, TK83 and TK85).

Reported TK90X sales in October 1986 were 2500 machines per month.

Technical details

There were two versions of the machine, with 16 KB and 48 KB of RAM. They contained the same Z80A processor running at 3.58 MHz, a ROM chip, and RAM chips (dynamic RAMs 4116 and 4416).  

Microdigital reverse engineered a CMOS integrated circuit (IC) with similar functionality to the original Bipolar IC ULA from Sinclair/Ferranti. The TV modulator was tuned to VHF channel 3, with the TV standard being hardware selectable to PAL-M (60 Hz) as used in Brazil, PAL-N (50 Hz) as used in Uruguay, Argentina and Paraguay and NTSC (60 Hz) as used in USA and many other countries. 

An improvement over the original ZX Spectrum was the sound output via modulated RF direct to the TV set instead of the beeper.

Most software written for the Spectrum ran on the TK90X, with some minor incompatibilities. Only three peripherals were released by Microdigital — a Joystick, a light pen interface and a parallel printer interface.

A Beta disc (48) interface was made by third party companies, called 'C.A.S. disk drive interface' (a near-clone from the original Beta disc interface), 'C.B.I. disk drive interface' (with a printer interface included) and 'IDS91' (with a printer interface included made by Synchron) or 'IDS2001ne' (these exclusively compatible only with the TK90X or TK95 {no ZX Spectrum use possible}, also from Synchron, and also with a printer interface included).

TK95
The TK90X was replaced by the TK95, which had a different keyboard (professional) and case (identical to the Commodore Plus4) and exactly the same circuit board and schematics. The motherboard was marked as TK90X. The unit had a few differences in the ROM that made the TK95 more compatible with the original ZX Spectrum. It used the same ULA chip, with only digital logic ports and the analogue part outside the ULA chip, exactly as in the TK90X. It was reported that the TK95 provided more compatibility with the original ZX Spectrum (e.g., the game Mikie runs only on the TK95, not on the TK90X. the D1 diode was disconnected and some changes to the ROM were made). Curiously, some games became incompatible due to this modification. TK90X users in Brazil used to make a switch to choose the original TK90X (or TK95) ROM or the ZX Spectrum ROM internally, so they could use almost all of the Spectrum's software.

Export model
During that period, Brazilians were not allowed to import computers and therefore the TK90X became the first affordable color computer for Brazilians. It was successful in other Latin America countries, such as Uruguay and Argentina, but the export model used a different circuit board and schematics, and an original Ferranti ULA from the ZX Spectrum. 

Because of its affordability, many commercial software programs were locally developed for the first time for use of small businesses in Latin America to run on the TK90X and millions of users had their first computer experience with it.

There's an active user base of enthusiasts of this computer, with dedicated websites discussing software preservation, peripherals and homebrew development and modifications.

References

External links 
 TK90X/95 Mailing list - Mailing list about TK90X/95/Spectrum (English Speakers are Welcome)
 ZEsarUX - ZX Second-Emulator And Released for UniX (GPL)

Microdigital Eletrônica 
Computer-related introductions in 1985
ZX Spectrum clones
Goods manufactured in Brazil